Rafael Vieira may refer to:

 Rafael Vieira (footballer, born 1992), Portuguese football centre-back
 Rafael Vieira (footballer, born 1995), Brazilian football centre-back

See also
 Rafael (footballer, born 1978), Rafael Pires Vieira, Brazilian football centre-forward